WKAQ (580 kHz) is a commercial AM radio station in San Juan, Puerto Rico. Currently owned by Uforia Audio Network pending a sale to Hemisphere Media Group, the station airs a Spanish language talk radio format. Its programming is repeated on WUKQ, which broadcasts on 1420 kHz in Ponce, and WYEL which broadcasts on 600 kHz in Mayagüez. The station was the first radio station to broadcast in Puerto Rico. According to Ernesto Vigoreaux, in the early days of music in Puerto Rico, the musicians would record music at the WKAQ radio station.  WKAQ is the Puerto Rico primary entry point station for the Emergency Alert System.

WKAQ was owned for many years by Angel Ramos, owner of the El Mundo newspaper, and eventual namesake for WKAQ-TV, branded as Telemundo. The El Mundo operated until 1986 when labor strikes and acts of terrorism ended its operation.

On May 9, 2022, Hemisphere Media Group, the owners of WAPA-TV, announced they would purchase WKAQ, WKAQ-FM, WUKQ, WUKQ-FM and WYEL from Univision Radio. The deal marks Hemisphere's entry to the radio business. During WAPA's 2023 upfront presentation, the network's management alluded that talent from the channel would also be joining the radio stations in the future and vice versa.

Notable current on-air staff 
 Jay Fonseca - Jay en el 580
 Rubén Sánchez - Temprano en la Mañana
 Ángel Rosa - Las Cosas como Son
 Carlos Díaz Olivo – political analyst WKAQ Analiza
 Luis Pabón Roca - political analyst WKAQ Analiza
 Veronique Abreu Tañon - WKAQ Intimus

References

External links 
 FCC History Cards for WKAQ
 FCC History Cards for WUKQ
 Official website

News and talk radio stations in Puerto Rico
Radio stations established in 1922
Univision Radio Network stations
KAQ
1922 establishments in Puerto Rico
Radio stations licensed before 1923 and still broadcasting